This is a list of seasons completed by the Oregon Ducks football team of the National Collegiate Athletic Association (NCAA) Division I Football Bowl Subdivision (FBS). Since the team's creation in 1893, the Ducks have participated in more than 1,100 officially sanctioned games.

Seasons

Notes

References

Oregon Ducks

Oregon Ducks football seasons